Matheus Cunha Queiroz (born 24 May 2001), known as Matheus Cunha, is a Brazilian footballer who plays as a goalkeeper for Campeonato Brasileiro Série A club Flamengo.

Career
Matheus Cunha made his debut on the 26 January 2022, starting for Flamengo in the Campeonato Carioca 2–1 home win against Portuguesa da Ilha.

Career statistics

Honours
Flamengo
Copa Libertadores: 2022
Copa do Brasil:  2022
Campeonato Carioca: 2021

References

External links

2001 births
Living people
Brazilian footballers
Association football goalkeepers
Campeonato Brasileiro Série A players
CR Flamengo footballers
Copa Libertadores-winning players